Weemelah is a small village in Moree Plains Shire, New South Wales, Australia. It is 3 km north off the Carnarvon Highway and 27 km east of Mungindi.

The main industry is agriculture. The Country Women's Association of New South Wales meets in Weemelah Hall. The nearest public transport is at Moree railway station. There are no schools in Weemelah, local children travel to Mungindi for their education.

The residents of Weemelah were isolated in January 2004 after local flooding.

Weemalah is situated on the Mungindi, or North West railway line, 762 km from Sydney. A railway station opened in 1914 as Bunarba and was renamed Weemalah in 1926. Passenger trains operated to Moree between 1926 and 1974, the station has now been removed and no trace remains. Large grain loading facilities still remain however, and Weemalah marks the northernmost point of grain train operation on the line; the line to Mungindi is closed beyond this location.

Notes

Towns in New South Wales
North West Slopes
Moree Plains Shire